Kosoian v Société de transport de Montréal, 2019 SCC 59 (colloquially referred to as The Escalator Handrail Case) is a decision of the Supreme Court of Canada on the public law immunity of police officers and public bodies. The Court unanimously held that police officers who enforced non-existent laws did not enjoy civil or criminal immunity over their actions. 

The case arose when a woman refused to comply with a pictogram directing her to hold the handrail of an escalator. She was ordered to comply by an officer who believed, and had been taught, (wrongly) that the pictogram represented a by-law. After she refused multiple demands, the officer arrested her.

Background 
On May 13, 2009, Bela Kosoian, a 38-year-old student of the Université du Québec à Montréal entered Montmorency Metro station in Laval on her way to attend class. As she began descending the escalator, she began rummaging through her bag for money to the buy a ticket.

An officer who was assigned to monitor subway stations in Laval, SPVM Constable Fabio Camacho, saw her and asked her to hold the handrail, as Camacho mistakenly believed that a pictogram asking Metro users to hold the escalator handrail represented a municipal bylaw. Kosoian refused, and a heated argument ensued. Constable Camacho told her that she would be ticketed if she did not hold the handrail. Kosoian protested and continued to refuse the demand. Camacho confronted her when she reached the bottom of the escalator, and told her to accompany him to a holding room so a statement of offence could be drawn up, but Kosoian refused the request and began to walk towards the subway turnstiles. 

Camacho and his partner used physical force in response. Camacho held her forearm to restrain her, and he and his partner then proceeded to move her to the holding room, dragging her by the elbows. Once at the holding room, Camacho asked her to identify herself, but she refused to comply with Camacho's unlawful demand and asked to contact a lawyer. Camacho then warned her that should she continue, she would be arrested for hindering the duties of a police officer, but Kosoian again refused to comply. She was subsequently placed under arrest and informed of her Charter rights.

Camacho then began searching her bag for a piece of identification. Kosoian objected, and he stepped on her foot in an attempt in seize the backpack. After she continued resisting the unlawful arrest, Camacho and his partner pinned Kosoian against the wall and handcuffed her, and seizing her bag. Camacho then made her sit in a chair as he and his partner searched her bag and promptly found her wallet and identification cards. She was then fined $100 dollars for not holding the handrail and $320 dollars for hindering an inspector in the performance of his duties.

According to Kosoian, she suffered serious psychological harm from the incident. The following day she met with a physician, who told her she was suffering from post-arrest anxiety and abrasions on her wrists and foot. A couple of days later, another physician diagnosed her with post-traumatic stress disorder and a strained ankle.

In lower courts 
The Société de transport de Montréal initiated a prosecution in municipal court to collect the tickets. On March 14, 2012, Judge Florent Bisson acquitted her of both offences, stating he was not satisfied beyond a reasonable doubt that there was an obligation to obey the pictogram. In his ruling, he also described Kosoian's testimony as credible, and rejected the prosecution's description of key events. 

Kosoian subsequently commenced civil proceedings against the officer, the city, and the Société, claiming they breached their duties under Quebec's civil code. She said that Camacho committed a fault by using physical restraint unreasonable in the circumstances, that the city was vicariously liable for the actions of Camacho, and that the Société was liable for misapplying the law. In her lawsuit, she claimed that the incident had caused her psychological suffering, minor injuries, and violated her dignity. She sought $69,000 in compensation and punitive damages. 

At the provincial Court of Quebec, the trial judge Denis Reste dismissed the action. According to him, Constable Camacho had not committed any fault. He claimed that the directives were clear, and the police officers' actions against her were entirely justified. He said it was Ms. Kosoian who had behaved in an inconceivable and stubborn manner by refusing to follow the officers' simple directions. On appeal, the Quebec Court of Appeal upheld the trial judge's finding. According to Justice Julie Dutil, Camacho did not commit a civil fault because he behaved like how any reasonable police officer would given his training, so even though he may have enforced a non-existent law, he was still protected from liability. She also exonerated the Société, saying it was protected by public law immunity, which shielded it from any civil liability resulting from the exercise of its regulatory powers unless bad faith could be proven. Finally, the Court also castigated Kosoian over the situation, claiming she was "the author of her own misfortune", saying that she should've simply complied, and then challenged the tickets in Court later.

Judgement 
Justice Suzanne Côté, writing for a unanimous court, overturned the Court of Appeal's ruling, and held the city, the officer, and the Société liable for civil fault against Ms. Kosoian. She wrote that because of their duty of maintaining peace, order, and public safety, police officers are empowered to use coercive powers of the state, but with that power comes the responsibility of fully understanding what statues they're responsible for enforcing. Because the importance of preventing abuses of power militates that there always be a legal basis for an officers' actions, any conduct in absence of such a basis is illegal and cannot be tolerated in a society founded on the rule of law. As such, she reasoned, officers who act without legal basis enjoy no public law immunity.

The Court emphazied, that though the officers erroneous training may reduce his fault when assessing damages, it could not absolve him of his responsibility to have an adequate knowledge of the law. And that even an officer who was just following orders can be held to be engaging in unreasonable conduct if they depart from what a normally prudent, diligent and competent police officer in the same circumstances would do.

Turning to the liability of the Société, Côté J held that they could not rely on public law immunity. She wrote that such immunity must be restricted to actually making and passing regulations, and could not shield an error in law in enforcement. Absent this immunity, Côté J said, the Société is liable for breach of extracontractual duties under the Civil Code of Quebec, just as any other legal person would be. 

Finally, Justice Côté strongly pushed back against the lower courts' assertions that Kosoian was "the master of her own misfortune" because of her stubborn behaviour. She emphazied that Ms. Kosoian could not be held responsible, either wholly or in part, over her decision to resist an unlawful order. Because No one in a free and democratic society has a duty to accept unjustified state intrusions, and it was not open to the courts to judge her for her resistance. Ultimately the Court awarded Kosoian $20,000 in compensation.

Commentary 
The decision was hailed by civil liberties advocates and legal experts. Fo Niemi of the Centre for Research Action on Race Relations called the decision, "a great victory for the constitutional rights of citizens". Journalist Rob Breakenridge, wrote an op-ed for Global News praising the decision as "an important victory for the rights of all Canadians". Cara Zwibel, on behalf of the Canadian Civil Liberties Association (CCLA), also praised the decision. The CCLA said it was particularly pleased by the court's explicit statement no one has the duty to identify themselves to an officer acting unlawfully.

See also 

 Fleming v Ontario, another unanimous Supreme Court judgement written by Justice Côté in 2019, restricting police powers

References

External links 
 

Supreme Court of Canada cases
2019 in Canadian case law